The 1983 IPSC Handgun World Shoot VI held in Virginia, United States, was the sixth IPSC Handgun World Shoot, and was won by Rob Leatham of USA, who had started shooting as a teenager.

Champions
Individual

Teams

See also 
IPSC Rifle World Shoots
IPSC Shotgun World Shoot
IPSC Action Air World Shoot

References

Match Results - 1983 Handgun World Shoot, USA - American Handgunner March/ April 1984, page 34 of 80

1983
1983 in shooting sports
Shooting competitions in the United States
1983 in American sports
International sports competitions hosted by the United States